Roberto Aguirre is the name of:

Roberto Aguirre-Sacasa (born 1973), American playwright
Roberto Aguirre Solís (born 1957), Mexican politician
Roberto Aguirre (footballer) (born 1942), Argentine footballer
Roberto Aguirre (football manager) (born 1968), Spanish football manager